Amjyot Singh Gill (born January 27, 1992) is an Indian professional basketball player. He has previously played for the Tokyo Excellence of the National Basketball Development League (NBDL) and the Delhi Capitals of the UBA Pro Basketball League. He and Amritpal Singh became the first Indian males to sign a professional basketball contract abroad.

At 6 ft 11 in (2.11 m), Singh is primarily a forward and has regularly competed with India on the international stage, playing in several editions of the FIBA Asia Championship. A native of Chandigarh, he was trained at the Ludhiana Basketball Academy in Ludhiana while playing for the Punjab state team. Early in his career, Singh spent several years with local teams in Punjab and Tamil Nadu, winning the Senior National Basketball Championship multiple times.

Early life and career 
Singh was born on 27 January 1992 in a jat sikh family in chandigarh . His mother Nirmal Kaur was an athlete, while his father Mohinder Singh was sub-inspector of the Chandigarh Police and a former member of the India national basketball team. Amjyot started out by playing cricket, the most popular game in India, and he was mainly a bowler. In high school, an injury prevented him from playing cricket for three months. During the time, Singh's interest of basketball grew, and his father and coach advised him to switch. He joined his high school team in 2007. Singh said, "In all honesty, I didn't even know the rules of basketball or even thought of playing the sport ever."

By 2008, Singh was promoted to the state team and the national under-16 team. He also joined the prestigious Ludhiana Basketball Academy in Ludhiana, Punjab. The Punjab state-run academy has trained many of India's top players, such as Satnam Singh Bhamara, Amritpal Singh, and Jagdeep Singh. With Ludhiana, Amjyot was coached by S. Subramanian. Singh, in 2010, led Punjab to a junior national basketball title as its captain. In March 2011, his Ludhiana team was defeated by Punjab Police Jalandhar at the Shaheed-e-azam Bhagat Singh Punjab Games championship.

Singh won the 2012 Senior National Basketball Championship with Punjab, helping defeat Tamil Nadu by 8 points. In May 2012, he was selected to play at the third edition of the India Basketball All-Star Showcase in Mumbai. In 2013, Singh left Punjab to join Tamil Nadu at the Senior National Basketball Championship. However, he was unable to play because he did not receive a No Objection Certificate (NOC) to compete for Tamil Nadu. Without Singh, they were defeated by his old team in the semifinal round. At the same event in 2014, Singh was forced to sit out again after suffering five fractures to his nose during the tournament. Despite his absence, his Tamil Nadu team won the title.

Professional career 
In the summer of 2015, Singh took part in the BJ Challenge Summer League in Japan, where he played for Hyogo Impulse, the developmental team to the Hyogo Storks, in pursuit of a professional contract. He saw immediate success in his first week with his team at the summer league. On 25 August 2015, he signed a one-year contract with the Tokyo Excellence of the National Basketball Development League (NBDL), the second-tier league in Japan. Singh and former Hyogo teammate Amritpal Singh, who joined the Excellence at the same time, became the first Indian men's players to play in a professional basketball league outside of India. He finished the season averaging 18 points, 10 rebounds, 2 assists, and 4 blocks per game.

On 17 March 2018 he was waived by the Oklahoma City Blue, but was re-signed five days later.

National team career 
Singh made his first international appearance for India with the under-16 national basketball team at the Children of Asia Games in Yakutia, Russia. In the following years, he played with the under-18 team and was soon promoted to the senior national team.

Singh made his first appearance for the senior team at the 2011 FIBA Asia Championship in Wuhan, China. In his debut on 15 September 2011, he recorded 2 points, 2 rebounds, and 2 blocks vs. Lebanon. At the event, Singh most notably posted a double-double of 13 points and a team-high 12 rebounds against Malaysia. Singh averaged 6.2 points, 7.2 rebounds, and 1.8 blocks per game mostly coming off the bench, but India would lose all four of their games.

In June 2013, Singh helped the India national basketball team earn a bid for the 2013 FIBA Asia Championship in Metro Manila, Philippines, scoring 13 points in a win over Afghanistan at the qualifying round of the SABA Championship. At the FIBA Asia Championship, Singh took on a starting role for the Indian team, averaging 9.6 points, 6.9 rebounds, and 1.4 blocks en route to a 2–6 record. India suffered an overtime loss to Bahrain in their opening game, as Singh scored 16 points and grabbed 14 rebounds.

Singh represented India at the 2015 FIBA Asia Championship in Changsha, China where he recorded most minutes, points, rebounds and blocks for his team. He was the tournament's overall second-best scorer. Later on he went on to represent India at the 2016 Williams Jones Invitational Cup followed by the 2016 FIBA Asia Challenge. Singh is also the first Indian national to participate in the FIBA 3x3 World Tour Finals. In 2016, he starred in the FIBA Asia Challenge, where he averaged 12.8 points, 8.3 rebounds, 2.4 assists, and 0.6 blocks. He led the tournament in free-throw percentage.

In July 2016, Singh competed at the William Jones Cup for India. He entered the tournament expected to be one of his team's top scorers.

References

External links
 Singh's 32 points & 11 rebounds against Palestine - 2015 FIBA Asia Championship Youtube.com video
 Asia-basket.com profile

1992 births
Living people
Asian Games competitors for India
Basketball players at the 2014 Asian Games
Basketball players from Punjab, India
Forwards (basketball)
Indian expatriate sportspeople in the United States
Indian expatriates in Japan
Indian men's basketball players
Oklahoma City Blue players
Basketball players from Chandigarh
Yokohama Excellence players
Wisconsin Herd players